Stadtmitte (City Centre) is a Berlin U-Bahn station on lines U2 and U6, located in the Mitte district.

Overview

The U2 platform opened on 1 October 1908 with the new U-Bahn section from Potsdamer Platz to Spittelmarkt. The station beneath the crossing of Friedrichstraße and Mohrenstraße was designed by Alfred Grenander and initially called Friedrichstraße. The second platform of the present-day U6 was finished on 30 January 1923, but was built about  southwards at the intersection of Friedrichstraße and Leipziger Straße, the main east-west thoroughfare of the Friedrichstadt quarter. The station received its current name in 1936.

This station was heavily damaged in World War II. On 7 May 1944, massive fire damage broke out in the entire station area. On 3 February 1945, there was heavy destruction in the entire station area involving gunshots, which was already badly damaged by fire. Several pillars were literally torn from their anchorage. A wall was pushed in by pure air pressure. The ceiling was later destroyed in the Battle of Berlin.

The U6 station was closed from 13 August 1961 due to the construction of the Berlin Wall. This station was also once a border station, and it is well connected to the U2 station. It looks nearly identical to the Schwartzkopffstraße station, the only difference being the presence of the compound where the tracks have become storerooms. Rolls of barbed wire were also installed to prevent escapees from crawling, and the entrances and transfer linkways were all locked with baby-lock gates. Armed guards were stationed at the southern side of the entrance. All were eliminated by 29 June 1990, and the station reopened on 1 July 1990.

References

U2 (Berlin U-Bahn) stations
U6 (Berlin U-Bahn) stations
Buildings and structures in Mitte
Railway stations in Germany opened in 1908